Alwin Francis (born 11 March 1987) is an Indian male badminton player.

Biography
Alvin Francis hails from Pala in Kottayam district of Kerala. He is currently training at the Gopichand Badminton Academy in Hyderabad.

Achievements

BWF International Challenge/Series
Men's doubles

 BWF International Challenge tournament
 BWF International Series tournament
 BWF Future Series tournament

References

External links 
 

Living people
1987 births
Indian male badminton players